

Season 
Coached by Luigi Radice, Inter had an awful start to the season failing in the Coppa Italia in the group stage, and losing three of four of the first league matches: fans used to describe it as a year of tears and blood. When the spring of 1984 was about to begin, Ernesto Pellegrini became the new chairman buying the club from Ivanoe Fraizzoli.

Inter resulted to have the best defence of the league, conceding only 23 goals in 30 games and achieving fourth place. This placement allowed the side take part in the 1984–85 UEFA Cup.

Squad 
Source:

Goalkeepers 
  Fabrizio Lorieri
  Walter Zenga

Defenders 
  Giuseppe Baresi
  Giuseppe Bergomi
  Graziano Bini
  Fulvio Collovati
  Riccardo Ferri
  Luca Meazza

Midfielders 
  Salvatore Bagni
  Evaristo Beccalossi
  Ludo Coeck
  Giampiero Marini
  Hansi Müller
  Giancarlo Pasinato
  Antonio Sabato

Forwards 
  Alessandro Altobelli
  Carlo Muraro
  Aldo Serena

Coach: Luigi Radice

Statistics

Serie A

League table

Matches

League results 

2 points for every win were awarded, so Inter collected 35 points instead 47.

Coppa Italia

Group 4

Players statistics 
Appearances and goals are referred to domestic league.

Zenga (30/−23); Baresi (29); Sabato (29/2); Altobelli (28/10); Serena A. (28/8); Bagni (27/2); Collovati (27/1); Müller H. (26/5); Bergomi (25); Ferri (24); Pasinato (23/1); Beccalossi (22/3); Bini (18/1); Marini (17); Coeck (9); Muraro (7); Dondoni (1); Meazza L. (1); Recchi (1).

UEFA Cup 

First round

Second round

Eightfinals

References 

Inter Milan seasons
Internazionale